Thomas Levett-Prinsep (born Thomas Levett; 1800/1–1849) was an English landowner in Derbyshire and Staffordshire. He took on the additional name of Prinsep on inheriting his uncle's holding of Croxall Hall.

Life
He was born at Wychnor Park in Wychnor, Staffordshire, the third son of Theophilus Levett. He was educated at Eton College, and matriculated at Trinity College, Oxford in 1828, aged 17.

In 1835, Levett inherited Croxall Hall in Derbyshire.

Croxall Hall descent

Croxall Hall is located eight miles (13 km) southwest of Burton-on-Trent. The Curzon family held it for 15 consecutive generations. Mary Curzon, the heiress of the Curzon family and governess to the Royal Family, married Sir Edward Sackville, 4th Earl of Dorset.

John Prinsep Esq., India merchant and progenitor of the Anglo-Indian family of the same name, purchased the property from George Sackville, 4th Duke of Dorset, and became lord of the manor. Croxall Hall is near to Catton Hall, once a property of the Anson family, who later intermarried with the Levetts of nearby Milford Hall, distant relations of Thomas Levett-Prinsep. 
Thomas Prinsep, High Sheriff of Derbyshire in 1802, died without an heir, and so left Croxall Hall to his nephew, the son of Theophilus Levett of Wychnor Hall, High Sheriff of Staffordshire, who had married in 1794 Frances Prinsep, daughter of John Prinsep of Croxall Hall, and sister of Thomas Prinsep. Prinsep left his property to his nephew Levett on condition that he adopt the name and coat of arms of Prinsep in addition to Levett.

Later life
Following his second marriage, Thomas Levett-Prinsep (as now he was) returned to Croxall Hall, which he had inherited from his father. He renovated the Hall, and built The Grange to manage his farmland. The couple moved to nearby Walton Hall, Walton-on-Trent.

Levett-Prinsep was a Derbyshire JP, member of the Tamworth Board of Guardians, and cattle breeder in Derbyshire. He died suddenly while crossing Teignmouth Harbour.

Family and legacy
Levett married:

In 1831 Margaret, the daughter of Scottish merchant David Monro, a seigneur, businessman and political figure in Lower Canada who, after building a fortune in the Canadian ironworks, left North America and moved to Bath, Somerset.
Following Margaret's death, in 1838 as his second wife Caroline Mary Templer. She was the daughter of Rev. John James Templer of Newton Abbot in Devon, the Rector of Teigngrace and a member of the Templer family who owned Stover House and the  Stover Estate in Devon – later sold due to Templer family financial troubles to Edward St Maur, 11th Duke of Somerset. Rev. Templer's other daughter Henrietta was married to Thomas Levett-Prinsep's elder brother Theophilus Levett, who had inherited the Levett family's Wychnor Park.

His children, surname Levett-Prinsep, included:

A daughter of the first marriage, Margaret Catherine Levett-Prinsep, born in 1837 in Bath. In 1860 she married her cousin Robert Thomas Kennedy Levett, son of John Levett and his wife, the former Sophia Eliza Kennedy, of Wychnor Park. Thomas Prinsep Levett (died 1938), George Arthur Monro Levett (died 1940) and Robert Kennedy Levett were their children.
A son, also Thomas Levett-Prinsep, heir to the Croxall estate at his early death in 1849. He married on 23 June 1868, at Stokenham, Devon, Georgina Holdsworth, daughter of Arthur Bastard Easterbrook Holdsworth of Widdicombe House; who was the son of Arthur Howe Holdsworth. Their granddaughter Katherine Mary married Lt. Col. Henry Edward Disbrow Wise, CBE, and their grandson Thomas Francis (Anthony) Levett-Prinsep (1909–1983) was an artist known as Anthony Prinsep; they were both children of their son Thomas Arthur Levett-Prinsep, born 1879.

The Levett-Prinsep heirs sold Croxall Hall in 1920, and moved to the West Country, closer to family relations there. The family eventually inherited Widdicombe House in Kingsbridge, Devon.

References

Sources 
 The Levetts of Staffordshire, Dyonese Levett Haszard, Milford, Staffordshire, privately printed
 Victoria County History: A History of the County of Stafford, M.W. Greenslade, R.B. Pugh (editors)

Date of birth unknown
1849 deaths
Thomas
People from the Borough of East Staffordshire
People from Derbyshire (before 1895)
People educated at Eton College
Alumni of Trinity College, Oxford
High Sheriffs of Derbyshire
Year of birth uncertain